The enzyme 2-phosphosulfolactate phosphatase (EC 3.1.3.71) catalyzes the reaction 

(2R)-2-phospho-3-sulfolactate + H2O  (2R)-3-sulfolactate + phosphate

This enzyme belongs to the family of hydrolases, specifically those acting on phosphoric monoester bonds.  The systematic name (R)-2-phospho-3-sulfolactate phosphohydrolase. Other names in common use include (2R)-phosphosulfolactate phosphohydrolase, and ComB phosphatase.

Structural studies

As of late 2007, only one structure has been solved for this class of enzymes, with the PDB accession code .

References

EC 3.1.3
Enzymes of known structure